Cerro Cora National Park (also spelled Cerro Corá) is the largest protected area in Paraguay with 5,538 hectares. It is located in Amambay Department, 45 km from the departmental capital, Pedro Juan Caballero and the border with Brazil. Established on February 11, 1976, it is a nature reserve, as well as a major historical site. It was the location where the last battle of the Paraguayan War took place on March 1, 1870.

Background 
The park has several historical monuments, a museum, and a recreation area by the Aquidabán River.

In addition to the historical background, many visitors come to the park to appreciate ancient rock writings located in hill caves around the area.

History 
The Paraguayan War (1864–1870) ended next to the Aquidaban Nigui Brook, where Francisco Solano López died saying his famous last words, "I die along with my country". Fortunately, Paraguay was not extinguished, as the Marshall announced, but was still deeply ruined by the war, which left the country desolated and deprived.

The Cerro Cora National Park, once a virgin Rain Forest that started to suffer deforestation. The area was declared protected, and the National Park was created.

The Park is surrounded by hills. Some of them are Ponta Porá, Guazu, Tacuru Pytâ, Alambique, Cerro Corá, Miron, Tanqueria y Tangaro. These and other elevations give shape to a peculiar landscape.

Route 
The Park is located 454 km from Asunción, and 45 km from Pedro Juan Caballero.
Visitors leaving from Asunción can take Ruta 2 to Coronel Oviedo city. There they would take Ruta 3 up to the connection with Ruta 5 and take the exit to Yby Yaú city.

Culture 
The Park is divided in zones, according to the theme of the place and accessibility. It has guides and guards. There is an auditorium, a visitors center and a recreation area.

Petroglyphs are inscribed in rock shelters throughout the park. A rock art research team from the National Museum and Research Center of Altamira dated the petroglyphs in 2008 and found that some of them were 5,000 years old. The Paï Tavytera indigenous peoples live in the region now.

Gallery

References

External links

Secretaria del Ambiente 

National parks of Paraguay
Protected areas established in 1976
Amambay Department
1976 establishments in Paraguay